Spring Hill is an unincorporated community in Walker County, Alabama, United States, located  north-northwest of Carbon Hill.

References

Unincorporated communities in Walker County, Alabama
Unincorporated communities in Alabama